The Albany-Decatur Twins were a minor league baseball team that represented the cities of Albany, Alabama, and Decatur, Alabama. They played in the Alabama-Tennessee League during its one season of existence in 1921, winning the league championship.

References

External links
Baseball Reference

Baseball teams established in 1921
Defunct minor league baseball teams
Professional baseball teams in Alabama
Defunct Alabama-Tennessee League teams
Sports clubs disestablished in 1921
1921 establishments in Alabama
1921 disestablishments in Alabama
Defunct baseball teams in Alabama
Baseball teams disestablished in 1921
Decatur, Alabama